Tom Cappan (born 12 July 1995) is a Belgian professional footballer who plays for Sportkring Sint-Niklaas, as a midfielder.

Career

Sint-Niklaas
On 28 August 2019 it was confirmed, that Cappan had returned to Sportkring Sint-Niklaas after two years in the Netherlands.

References

External links

1995 births
Living people
Belgian footballers
Sportkring Sint-Niklaas players
Royal Cappellen F.C. players
RKC Waalwijk players
Belgian Third Division players
Eerste Divisie players
Association football midfielders
Belgian expatriate footballers
Belgian expatriate sportspeople in the Netherlands
Expatriate footballers in the Netherlands